The Lega Basket Serie A awards are the yearly individual awards that are given by Italy's top-tier professional basketball league, the Lega Basket Serie A (LBA).

In 2015, the awardees were chosen by a panel of journalists along with one of the head coaches, general manager and captains of each the 16 teams in the league.

LBA MVP

Player nationalities by national team.

LBA Finals MVP

Player nationalities by national team.

LBA Best Player Under 22
Player nationalities by national team.

LBA Best Coach

LBA Best Executive

Premio Reverberi (Oscar del Basket)

References

External links
"Individual prizes of the league.", Lega Basket. Retrieved on 22 May 2015.